Elżbieta Szemplińska née Sobolewska (born April 29, 1910, in Warsaw, died April 27, 1991, in Warsaw) was a Polish poet and prose writer.

She studied law at University of Warsaw. Her first pieces of prose were published in 1926 in the paper Robotnik. In 1932 she published her first full-length novel "Narodziny człowieka" (Birth of a Man). In 1939, after the Soviet occupation of Lwów she was the editor of the Lwów collaborationist quarterly "Almanach Literacki" (Literary Almanac), an organ of the "Sojuz Pisatielej" (Writers' Soviet) of the Soviet Union. In 1946 she was part of the diplomatic corps for the People's Republic of Poland in Luxembourg. Between 1946 and 1962 she resided in Western Europe. She came back to Warsaw in 1962.

1910 births
1991 deaths